The 2019–20 WHL season was the 54th season of the Western Hockey League (WHL). The regular season began on September 20, 2019, and was scheduled to end on March 22, 2020. Due to the COVID-19 pandemic in North America the regular season was suspended on March 12, 2020, and cancelled six days later along with the playoffs. This season was the first season for the Winnipeg Ice after being moved to Winnipeg, Manitoba, from Cranbrook, British Columbia.

The post-season was scheduled to begin on March 27, 2020, in which sixteen teams would have competed for the Ed Chynoweth Cup and be crowned champions of the WHL.

Suspension and cancellation of regular season
On March 12, 2020, the WHL announced that the season was suspended until further notice due to the COVID-19 pandemic. Six days later, on March 18, the WHL announced that the remainder of the regular season was cancelled, and the intent to have playoffs later. The final WHL standings are based on win percentage for all clubs.

Cancellation of playoffs and Memorial Cup
On March 23, 2020, the WHL announced the cancellation of the playoffs due to the COVID-19 pandemic. The Canadian Hockey League announced that the 2020 Memorial Cup scheduled for Kelowna, British Columbia, was cancelled.

Final standings

Note: GP = Games played; W = Wins; L = Losses; OTL = Overtime losses; SL = Shootout losses; GF = Goals for; GA = Goals against; PTS = Points; x = clinched playoff berth; y = clinched division title; z = clinched conference title

Statistics

Scoring leaders 

Players are listed by points, then goals.

Note: GP = Games played; G = Goals; A = Assists; Pts. = Points; PIM = Penalty minutes

Goaltenders 
These are the goaltenders that lead the league in GAA that have played at least 1500 minutes.

Note: GP = Games played; Mins = Minutes played; W = Wins; L = Losses; OTL = Overtime losses; SOL = Shootout Losses; SO = Shutouts; GAA = Goals against average; Sv% = Save percentage

WHL awards

All-Star Teams

Eastern Conference

Western Conference

Attendance

See also 
 2020 Memorial Cup
 List of WHL seasons
 2019–20 OHL season
 2019–20 QMJHL season
 2019 in ice hockey
 2020 in ice hockey

References

External links 

 Official website of the Western Hockey League
 Official website of the Canadian Hockey League
 Official website of the MasterCard Memorial Cup
 Official website of the Subway Super Series

Western Hockey League seasons
Whl
WHL
WHL